Little Clearfield Creek is a  tributary of Clearfield Creek in Clearfield County, Pennsylvania in the United States.

It is formed by the confluence of Gazzam Run and Watts Creek.

Tributaries
Gazzam Run

See also
List of rivers of Pennsylvania

References

Rivers of Pennsylvania
Tributaries of the West Branch Susquehanna River
Rivers of Clearfield County, Pennsylvania